Kasey Jamal Douglas (born 8 April 2000) is an English professional footballer who plays as a forward

Club career
Born in Huntingdon, Cambridgeshire, Douglas attended St Peter's School in the town. He started his career playing junior football in Huntingdon before joining Peterborough United at the age of nine. He made his debut for the Posh in November 2016 whilst still a first-year scholar at the age of sixteen, also becoming the club's fifth youngest debutant, when he came on as a substitute for Paul Taylor in the 2–1 win over Barnet in the EFL Trophy. In February 2017, he signed for Southern League Premier Division side St Ives Town on a work-experience loan deal.

Career statistics

References

External links

2000 births
Living people
People from Huntingdon
Association football forwards
English footballers
Peterborough United F.C. players
St Ives Town F.C. players
Southern Football League players